Kenneth Allan "Kenny" Stroud (born 1 December 1953) is an English former footballer who made more than 400 appearances in the Football League playing for Swindon Town, where he spent the majority of his career, Newport County and Bristol City. He played as a midfielder or defender.

Stroud was born in Fulham, London. He played for the Swindon schools team that reached the national boys' final in 1969, and went on to become an England youth international. He made his first-team debut for Swindon Town on 4 September 1971, a goalless draw with Queens Park Rangers in the Second Division, a match in which highlights were shown that evening on BBC1's Match of the Day programme. Over the next eleven seasons he made 373 appearances for Swindon in all first-team competitions, scoring 19 goals. He finished his professional career at Newport County and then Bristol City.

Stroud's son David also played professionally for Swindon Town.

References

5. The TC&I song "Kenny" from their Great Aspirations EP is said to be about Kenny Stroud.

External links
 

1953 births
Living people
Footballers from Fulham
English footballers
Association football defenders
Association football midfielders
Bristol City F.C. players
Swindon Town F.C. players
Newport County A.F.C. players
English Football League players
England youth international footballers